John Horgan (born 1959) is a Canadian politician and the current Premier of British Columbia.

John Horgan may also refer to:

Politicians
 John Horgan (Australian politician) (1834–1907), Australian politician, Western Australia MLC
 John Horgan (Irish politician) (1876–1955), Irish politician
 John Horgan (Irish nationalist) (1881–1967), Irish Cork-born nationalist politician, solicitor and author

Sportspeople
 John Horgan (hurler) (1950–2016), Irish sportsperson
 John G. Horgan (1866–1921), pocket billiards (pool) player

Others
 John Horgan (academic) (born 1940), Irish press ombudsman, former journalist, politician and professor
 John Horgan (journalist) (born 1953), American science journalist
 John Horgan (psychologist) (born 1974), Irish political psychologist, terrorism researcher, and professor
 John Horgan, chairman of the Western Australian Development Corporation